Siphlophis compressus (also known as mapepire de fe, tropical flat snake and red vine snake) is a snake found in tropical Central and South America and Trinidad and Tobago.  It feeds on small lizards, other snakes, small mammals and probably on frogs and nestling birds, as well as the eggs of nesting birds and lizards.

References

Bibliography

Colubrids
Reptiles of Trinidad and Tobago
Vertebrates of Guyana
Reptiles described in 1803
Snakes of South America